The Gillig Phantom is a series of buses that was produced by an American manufacturer Gillig Corporation in Hayward, California.  The successor to the long-running Gillig Transit Coach model line, the Phantom marked the transition of Gillig from a producer of yellow school buses to that of transit buses.  The first transit bus assembled entirely by Gillig (from 1977 to 1979, the company assembled a few buses in a joint venture with Neoplan), the Phantom was produced exclusively as a high-floor bus (with step entrance).

As operator needs shifted towards low-entry buses in North America, Gillig introduced the Gillig H2000LF/Low Floor.  Initially produced alongside the Low Floor, in 2008, Gillig ended production of the Phantom to concentrate entirely on low-floor bus production.  The final Gillig Phantom was produced in September 2008, with the final examples acquired by Sound Transit.

Model overview
Across its production, the Gillig Phantom was produced in three primary configurations.  Alongside the standard transit bus, Gillig offered a suburban configuration (fitted with forward-facing seats) and the Gillig Phantom School Bus (adapted for school bus use).

Transit bus 
When introduced in 1980, the Gillig Phantom was offered in a single configuration: a 96-inch width and a 35-foot body length.  For 1981, additional 30-foot and 40-foot lengths were introduced; in 1983, a 102-inch body width entered production.  From 2005 onward, only the 102-inch-wide version was available due to stricter emissions and accessibility requirements.

Transit versions of the Phantom were produced with a front entrance door and a mid-ship entrance door; two configurations of the latter were available.  Transit operators typically opted for the standard width, while the wider version was specified by airport shuttle operators and rental car agencies.  For either entrance, a wheelchair lift (integrated into the step entrance) was available as an option; if specified for the rear entrance, the wider width was configured.

During its production, the exterior of the Phantom saw little change; an exception was the modernization of its destination sign (switching from a rollsign to an LED display).  Dual or quad headlights were offered (with the latter becoming the most common on transit buses).  While a mandatory design feature on the Phantom School Bus, a rear window was a rare option for transit/suburban Phantoms; Monterey-Salinas Transit and King County Metro are the only two transit authorities known to have ordered Phantoms with a rear window. On transit/suburban versions, several window configurations were offered; fixed side windows were a rarely ordered option. Both TheBus (Honolulu) and Sound Transit Express (for their 2008 Phantoms) had non-opening windows as part of their orders.

Suburban version 
The suburban version of the Phantom transit bus was offered throughout its production.  Distinguished by forward facing seats (rather than perimeter seating and standee provisions), these versions were configured for longer routes.  In one configuration, the mid-ship entrance door is optional.  Other options included on-board luggage racks (typically mounted above the seats).

School bus

Introduced in 1986, production of the Phantom School Bus ended after 1993.  In a fashion similar to the long-running Gillig Transit Coach School Bus, while available across the United States, sales of the Phantom School Bus were concentrated to operators on the West Coast.  Although initially well-received, sales of the vehicle dropped off at the end of the 1980s.  As school bus production became increasingly competitive in the early 1990s, Gillig ended production of the Phantom School Bus after 1993, concluding 7 years of school bus production.

Using much of the mass-transit Gillig Phantom as a donor platform, the design was the first fully redesigned Gillig school bus in 46 years.  While used in mass-transit and motorcoach construction, the monocoque (unibody) chassis construction of the Phantom was largely untested in the school bus segment (with the notable exception of the Crown Supercoach).  As a consequence of using the Phantom chassis, Gillig was also forced to abandon the mid-engine layout offered by the Transit Coach.

Gillig offered the Phantom School Bus in two body lengths during its production: 37 feet (78 passenger capacity) and 40 feet (84 or 87 passenger capacity).  As federal regulations of the time did not permit the use of a 102" width body for a school bus, the Phantom School Bus used the narrower 96" body width of the Phantom (discontinued in 2004).

For its 1986 introduction, Gillig offered the Phantom School Bus a range of diesel engines, including the Caterpillar 3208 V8 (school buses were largely the only Phantoms with this engine) and the Detroit Diesel 6V92TA (replacing the 6V71 from the Transit Coach).  The Phantom school bus was available with several transmission choices; all of which were carried over from the Transit Coach: the Allison MT-643 and MT-647 4-speed automatics; the MT-654CR 5-speed automatic; and the heavier-duty HT-747 automatic.  For school districts with mountainous terrain, the Phantom offered two manual transmission options: the Fuller Roadranger RT6610 and RT11610 10-speeds.

Design modifications 
To convert the Phantom into a school bus, Gillig made a number of changes to the exterior and interior to comply with school bus design standards at both state and federal levels.  While the most distinctive changes were the addition of school bus yellow exterior paint and the fitment of high-back forward-facing padded school bus seats, a number of other design changes were phased in as well.

On the forward section of the body, the driver-side windshield was modified, switching from angled to vertically mounted glass.  The quad headlights were replaced in favor of dual headlights (although quad headlamps remained an option).  To properly meet design regulations, the Phantom School Bus was fitted with larger sideview mirrors, convex mirrors, and front cross-view mirrors.  To give the school bus traffic priority, red warning lights (and amber lights, for Phantom school buses sold outside of California) were fitted in the front and rear roof caps along with a side stop arm.

As it served as a rear emergency exit, the Phantom School Bus was fitted with a rear window; as a requirement for rear-engine buses, the bus was fitted with a left-side emergency-exit door.

A number of changes were focused on the sides of the body.  As the vehicle was to be used for school routes and not for transit use, the rear curbside exit was deleted (a design change also forced by regulations).  In place of transit-style windows, narrower split-sash windows (required for school buses) were fitted to the body.  To reinforce the body structure, Gillig added two full-length steel rails below the window line; unlike most school buses, the structure of the Phantom was additionally reinforced above the window line as well.

The Phantom School Bus was not factory-produced with a wheelchair lift; the transit-style wheelchair lift was deleted from the stepwell.  As a result, the entry door on the Phantom School Bus was several inches narrower than its mass-transit counterpart.  However, Gillig continued to offer a kneeling feature from the mass-transit Phantom as an option, allowing the driver to lower the front of the bus to curb level when loading/unloading passengers.

Powertrain
The Phantom was originally equipped with either a Detroit Diesel 6V92TA, 6V71, or Cummins L-10 diesel engine, and was later available with either a Cummins ISB, ISC, ISL, or ISM diesel engine. The Phantom was formerly available with the Detroit Diesel Series 50 engine from 1993 until 2004 when Detroit Diesel cut production of the Series 50 engine.  The Detroit Diesel Series 40 engine was available from 1995 to 2003.

A liquefied natural gas fueled version was produced beginning in 1992; it was later discontinued.  A diesel-electric hybrid powered version was sold from 1996 to 2006; MTA in New York purchased a Gillig Phantom hybrid demo bus as well as diesels for MTA Long Island bus.  From 2001 to 2003, King County Metro purchased 100 Gillig Phantoms to convert to trolleybuses.  Purchased as "gliders" with no powertrain, the buses were fitted with the trolleybus propulsion system from its previous fleet, saving over $20 million from an all-new design.

See also 

 Gillig Low Floor
 Flxible Metro
 NABI 416
 Neoplan Transliner
 Orion V
 GMC/TMC/NovaBus RTS

References

Further reading 
Gillig Corporation, gillig.com, Retrieved on 2006-12-25
Gillig Phantom gillig.com, Retrieved on 2010-02-02
Gillig Transit Coach / Pacific SchoolCoach Online Museum, gilligcoaches.net, Retrieved on 2006-12-25
GM Brings Clean Mass Transit to Environmental Conference, allisontransmission.com, Retrieved on 2006-12-25
Stauss, Ed (1988). The Bus World Encyclopedia of Buses, Woodland Hills, CA: Stauss Publications.

External links 

Buses of the United States
Gillig
School buses
Vehicles introduced in 1980